Petrichor is the earthy scent produced when rain falls on dry soil. The word is constructed , the ethereal fluid that is the blood of the gods in Greek mythology.

Origins
Long before this phenomenon received its name in 1964, it had been noticed and discussed in scientific circles.

Phipson was referring to a short paper read by Berthelot and André at the meeting of the French Académie des Sciences on 23 April 1891, and printed in Volume 112 (1891) of Comptes Rendus, entitled "Sur l'Odeur propre de la Terre" ("On the earth's own smell").

Phipson continues, "I find, on referring to my old notes, which are dated 1865, that it is doubtful whether I ever published the results of  these observations; and as the  distinguished chemists I have just named have not quite solved the problem, I hasten to give the results I obtained so long ago." He then theorizes that the odour "... was due to the presence of organic substances closely related to the essential oils of plants ..." and that these substances consist of "... the fragrance emitted by thousands of  flowers ..." absorbed into the pores of the soil, and only released when displaced by rain. After attempts to isolate it, he found that it "... appeared to be very similar to, if not identical with, bromo-cedren derived from essence of cedar."

The phenomenon was first scientifically described in a March 1964 paper by Australian researchers Isabel Bear and Dick Thomas, published in the journal Nature. Thomas coined the term "petrichor" to refer to what had previously been known as "argillaceous odour". In the article, the authors describe how the smell derives from an oil exuded by certain plants during dry periods, whereupon it is absorbed by clay-based soils and rocks. During rain, the oil is released into the air along with another compound, geosmin, a metabolic by-product of certain actinobacteria, such as Streptomyces, which is emitted by wet soil, producing the distinctive scent; ozone may also be present if there is lightning. In a follow-up paper, Bear and Thomas (1965) showed that the oil slows seed germination and early plant growth.

Mechanism
When a raindrop lands on a porous surface, air from the pores forms small bubbles, which float to the surface and release aerosols. Such aerosols carry the scent, as well as bacteria and viruses from the soil. Raindrops that move at a slower rate tend to produce more aerosols; this serves as an explanation for why petrichor is more common after light rains. Members of the Actinomycetes, gram-positive bacteria, are responsible for producing these aerosols.

The human nose is sensitive to geosmin and is able to detect it at concentrations as low as 0.4 parts per billion. Some scientists believe that humans appreciate the rain scent because ancestors may have relied on rainy weather for survival. Camels in the desert also rely on petrichor to locate sources of water such as oases.

See also
 Dimethyl sulfide – One of the molecules responsible for the odour of the sea
 Mitti attar – a perfume that recreates the loamy smell of a first rain

Citations

General references 
 Bear, I.J. & Thomas, R.G. (September 1966), "Genesis of Petrichor", Geochimica et Cosmochimica Acta, Vol. 30, No. 9, pp. 869–879.

External links

 "Petrichor" at A Word a Day
 From the Oxford English Dictionary
 
 
 Petrichor, U. K. Met office.
 Why is the Smell After it Rains So Appealing? The Petrichor phenomenon
 Petrichor – Why we Love the Smell of Rain

1964 neologisms
Olfaction
Precipitation
Soil
Rain
Foul-smelling chemicals